Tolubeyev is a Russian surname. Notable people with the surname include:

 Andrei Tolubeyev (1945–2008), Soviet and Russian actor
 Yuri Tolubeyev (1906–1979), Soviet and Russian actor

Russian-language surnames